Damat  Yemişçi Hasan Pasha (1535, Rogovë, Kosovo – 18 October 1603, Istanbul, Turkey) was an Albanian Ottoman statesman.

Hasan, an Albanian who spent his childhood in Rogovo, then went to Prizren, where he finished his primary education. He pursued the remainder of his education at the military academy in Istanbul. After a military career, Hasan became grand vizier of the Ottoman Empire from 1602 to 1603. He was executed by Sultan Mehmed III in 1603.

He married Ayşe Sultan (1570 – 15 May 1605), a daughter of Murad III, on 5 April 1602. She had previously been married to Damat Ibrahim Pasha.

References

See also
 List of Ottoman Grand Viziers
 Turks in Kosovo

Military personnel of the Ottoman Empire
Albanian Grand Viziers of the Ottoman Empire
1535 births
1603 deaths
17th-century Grand Viziers of the Ottoman Empire
17th-century executions by the Ottoman Empire
Damats
Kosovan Turks
Albanian Pashas
Ottoman Sufis
Albanian Sufis
16th-century Albanian people
17th-century Albanian people
Kosovo Albanians
Albanians from the Ottoman Empire